Governor Barbour may refer to:

Haley Barbour (born 1947), 63rd Governor of Mississippi
James Barbour (1775–1842), 18th Governor of Virginia

See also
Amos W. Barber (1861–1915), 2nd Governor of Wyoming